The Red Garland Trio (also referred to as Moodsville Volume 6) is an album by pianist Red Garland recorded in 1958 and released on the Moodsville label in 1960.

Reception
The Allmusic site awarded the album 2 stars stating "Its slow tempos fit well into the theme of that subsidiary's releases but it resulted in the set being a bit sleepy... the lack of variety makes this reissue one of Red Garland's lesser efforts.

Track listing 
 "I Love You Yes I Do" (Sally Nix & Henry Glover) – 6:17
 "Blues for Ann" – 7:40 
"I'll Never Stop Loving You" (Nicholas Brodszky) – 6:30 
 "And the Angels Sing" (Ziggy Elman, Johnny Mercer) – 6:47
 "'Tain't Nobody's Bizness If I Do" (Porter Grainger, Everett Robbins) – 7:59 
 "Bass-ment Blues" (Red Garland) – 7:56

Personnel 
 Red Garland - piano
 Paul Chambers - bass
 Art Taylor - drums

References 

Red Garland albums
1960 albums
Albums recorded at Van Gelder Studio
Moodsville Records albums